Novica Eraković (Cyrillic: Новица Ераковић; born 16 March 1999) is a Montenegrin professional footballer who plays as a midfielder for Montenegrin First League club Sutjeska and the Montenegro national team.

Club career
Eraković is a youth product of Sutjeska, and began his senior career on loan with Lovćen in the Montenegrin First League for the 2018-19 season. He extended his contract with the club on 10 March 2022. He helped Sutjeska win the 2021–22 Montenegrin First League, and was named into the league's team of the season.

International career
Eraković is a youth international for Montenegro, having played for the Montenegro U21s. He received his first callup to the senior Montenegro national team for a set of friendlies in March 2022. He debuted in a 1–0 friendly loss to Armenia on 23 March 2022.

Honours
Sutjeska
 Montenegrin First League: 2021–22

References

External links
 
 
 FSCG Profile

1999 births
Living people
Footballers from Nikšić
Montenegrin footballers
Montenegro international footballers
Montenegro under-21 international footballers
Association football midfielders
FK Lovćen players
FK Sutjeska Nikšić players
Montenegrin First League players